Peter Ishkhans is a former Beverly Hills, California-based stylist and salon owner who went on to host Style Network's Peter Perfect.    In 2009, Peter Perfect was nominated for a Daytime Emmy as outstanding lifestyle show, while Ishkhans was nominated for outstanding lifestyle host.

References

Living people
British television personalities
British hairdressers
British expatriates in the United States
Year of birth missing (living people)